Sheila Kathleen Laxon  is a New Zealand/Australian racehorse trainer. She was the first female Thoroughbred horse trainer to win the Australian cups double, the Caulfield Cup and Melbourne Cup, with her mare Ethereal in 2001. Her efforts were recognised when she took out the Fred Hoysted Award for the Australian season's outstanding training performance.

Laxon was born in Pontypridd, Glamorgan, Wales. Her early childhood was spent on a small farm run by her mother. Her father was away from home much of the time working as a ship's pilot. It was on the farm that Laxon developed a passion for horses through pony clubs, gymkhanas and showjumping.

Before emigrating to New Zealand around 1980, she spent time working with English trainer John L. Dunlop at his stables in Arundel, Sussex.

In New Zealand in 1983 she married trainer Laurie Laxon who had a large stable with many successful horses. She rode many of them in trackwork,  including Empire Rose who won the 1988 Melbourne Cup. She took out her own training license in 1997.

In the 2002 Queen's Birthday and Golden Jubilee Honours, Laxon was appointed an Officer of the New Zealand Order of Merit, for services to racing.

Laxon is still currently training in a partnership with John Symons at Whiteheads Creek in country Victoria.

References

 That Sheila! A straight shooter
 JSL Racing web site
 Brain Injury Centre interview

Living people
Horse trainers from Melbourne
New Zealand racehorse trainers
Officers of the New Zealand Order of Merit
Sportspeople from Pontypridd
Welsh emigrants to Australia
Year of birth missing (living people)